The 2013–14 Professional Arena Soccer League season was the sixth season for the PASL, an American professional indoor soccer league. The regular season started on November 1, 2013 and ended on February 16, 2014. After regional playoffs in late February, the three regional winners and host Chicago Mustangs competed at the Sears Centre for the Ron Newman Cup on March 15–16, 2014. The Mustangs capped a perfect season by winning the league championship.

Teams

Returning clubs
In advance of news from the league's 2013 summer meetings, the exact size and composition of the PASL for the 2013–14 season was unclear. Reigning champion San Diego Sockers and league attendance leader Dallas Sidekicks were sure to return. The Sockers were scheduled to play an outdoor exhibition match against a Mexico All-Stars team at Balboa Stadium on September 1. The game was the first outdoor contest for the Sockers since 1984.

The Harrisburg Heat announced in early July 2013 that head coach Richard Chinapoo and assistant Gino DiFlorio would return to lead the team for the 2013–14 season. On July 24, Chinapoo announced that this season would be his last in Harrisburg as he will move to Florida in August 2014 to be with his wife and daughter. The Heat scheduled two open tryouts at Sports City Harrisburg, the first on September 15 and the second on October 6. Training camp for the team opened on October 21.

Last season's Central Division champion Rio Grande Valley Flash returned under new ownership as "La Fiera FC". Head coach Mariano Bollella also returned to lead the team at State Farm Arena. In late July, the team announced Joaquín García Fernández as its new president. By league mandate, the team's name was changed to Hidalgo La Fiera to reflect its home city.

On July 19, 2013, the Illinois Piasa announced that they would play this season at The Field Sports Complex in Pontoon Beach, Illinois. Formerly known as "Sports For Fun", this facility had been the Piasa's home turf from 2008 through 2011. On July 22, the team announced that head coach Jason Norsic had resigned for personal and family reasons. The team scheduled open tryouts for August 24–25 at The Field Sports Complex.

Contraction
Teams that struggled at the box office, were taken over by the league, or were unable to relocate to meet the league's new 1,000-seat minimum for home arenas variously sought demotion, suspension, or dissolution. In late May 2013, the ownership of the Anaheim Bolts announced that due to increasing costs and poor attendance they would seek a new buyer for the franchise and that the team would not play in the 2013–14 season. July 2013 press reports stated that Rockford Rampage and Real Phoenix would not return for this season. Without fanfare, the league removed the Ohio Vortex and Arizona Storm from their list of affiliated teams in August 2013. The Tacoma Stars went on hiatus for the 2013–14 season on August 23, 2013. The organization instead fielded a squad called "Tacoma Galaxy" in the Premier Arena Soccer League.

Expansion
The PASL added several new teams for the 2013–14 season:

Originally announced in July 2012, the Tulsa Revolution play at the Tulsa Convention Center in Tulsa, Oklahoma. The team held its first open tryout in mid-July 2013. The Williams Companies signed as the team's presenting sponsor for their debut season.
In late May 2013, the owners of the now-dormant Anaheim Bolts announced that they would instead field a new PASL team at the Citizens Business Bank Arena in Ontario, California. The team held its first open tryouts on June 28–29. On July 25, team president Bernie Lilavois announced that "Ontario Fury" was chosen from over 500 fan-submitted entries in a name-the-team contest. The name, logo, and team colors all reflect the passion of local soccer fans and the "powerful elements" of heat and wind that characterize the Inland Empire climate.
In June 2013, the Wichita Wings of the MISL folded but a successor corporation named FC Wichita LLC announced their intention to join the PASL for the 2013–14 season. The name and home arena for the Wichita, Kansas, based team were not immediately announced. On July 10, the team announced that it secured a lease at Hartman Arena but planned to delay joining the PASL until the 2014–15 season. On July 23, the PASL announced that a different ownership group had secured its own Hartman Arena lease and the franchise to play in Wichita for the 2013–14 season. On August 22, the team announced that it will play as the "Wichita B-52s" to honor the city's aviation heritage. Indoor soccer veteran Larry Inlow serves as head coach.
The league also added the expansion Cleveland Freeze, Mexico-based teams Monterrey Flash and Saltillo Rancho Seco, plus Bay Area Rosal and the Cincinnati Saints moved up from the PASL-Premier to the pro league.

Launch delayed
In April 2013, the league announced that a new team will play at the Laredo Energy Arena in Laredo, Texas. A fan contest in May 2013 named the team "Laredo Diesel" but, citing marketability, franchise owner Dr. Judson Somerville changed the name to  Laredo Honey Badgers on July 24. On September 27, 2013, the team confirmed that, due to the financial and legal difficulties faced by their owner, they would delay entry into the league until the 2014–15 season.

Standings
As of 2/16/2014

(Bold) Division Winner

2014 Ron Newman Cup

Playoff format
On December 24, The PASL selected San Diego, Dallas, Ontario, and Chicago as possible sites for the 2014 Ron Newman Cup Final Four. The sites were initially determined based on several factors including venue availability and suitability. The potential hosts were evaluated based on attendance, accessibility and the teams' competitive history. On January 22, the PASL announced that Chicago would host the PASL Final Four tournament at the Sears Centre while the amateur Premier Arena Soccer League will hold its championship at the Grand Sports Arena, the Mustangs' usual home field this season.

The top three teams in each division will qualify for the Newman Cup Playoffs.  In the host team's division, the three top teams other than the host will qualify, creating a total field of 10 playoff teams. As host, Chicago gets an automatic bye past the playoffs and directly to the Final Four tournament.

In each division the division winner (or next best team other than the host), will get a first round bye.  The #3 seed will play at #2 and the winner of that game will play at the #1 seed. The three divisional playoff winners will join the host team in the Final Four.  All rounds of the playoffs will be single elimination.

The PASL named the Newman Cup Most Valuable Player award the Aaron Susi Trophy, after the California Cougars/San Diego Sockers player who was a member of the league's first five championship teams.

Eastern Division Bracket

Central Division Bracket

Pacific Division Bracket

PASL Final 4 Bracket

(@ Chicago, IL)

Schedule

Divisional First Round

Divisional Finals

Newman Cup Semi-Finals

Newman Cup Third Place

Newman Cup Championship

Statistics

Top scorers
Last updated on February 22, 2014. Source:

Awards

Player of the Week

Individual Awards

All-League First Team

All-League Second Team

Honorable Mention

References

External links
PASL official website

 
Professional Arena Soccer League
Professional Arena Soccer League
Professional Arena Soccer League seasons